Yucuna (Jukuna), also known as Matapi, Yucuna-Matapi, and Yukunais, is an Arawakan language spoken in several communities along the Mirití-Paraná River in Colombia. Extinct Guarú (Garú) was either a dialect or a closely related language.

Phonology 
The Yucuna phoneme inventory consists of 22 consonants and 16 vowels.

The language

Notes and references

Notes

Bibliography

External links 
 Resources by ethnographer Laurent Fontaine:
 Audio recordings in the Yucuna language, in open access (source: Pangloss Collection of CNRS).
 The Yucuna Indians
 Corpus of myths and tales (in Yucuna and French)
 Ethnographic films of the Yucuna Indians with texts of dialogues

 Resources by linguist Magdalena Lemus Serrano:
 Documentation of Yucuna (source: Endangered Languages Archive).

Languages of Colombia
Arawakan languages